The 2016 United States presidential election in Kentucky was held on Tuesday, November 8, 2016, as part of the 2016 United States presidential election in which all 50 states plus the District of Columbia participated. Kentucky voters chose electors to represent them in the Electoral College via a popular vote, pitting the Republican Party's nominee, businessman Donald Trump, and running mate Indiana Governor Mike Pence against Democratic Party nominee, former Secretary of State Hillary Clinton, and her running mate Virginia Senator Tim Kaine. Kentucky has eight electoral votes in the Electoral College.

Although Kentucky was won twice by southern Democrat Bill Clinton in 1992 and 1996, Trump easily carried the state with 62.52% of the vote to Hillary Clinton's 32.68%, a margin of 29.84%. Trump won Kentucky by the largest margin of any Republican in history, and he swept counties across the state. Clinton only carried the state's two most urban and populous counties: Jefferson County, home to Louisville; and Fayette County, home to Lexington, both of which traditionally vote Democratic. The Bluegrass State was also one of eleven states to have twice voted for Bill Clinton but against his wife Hillary in 2016.

Trump's victory in Kentucky made it his fifth-strongest state in the 2016 election after West Virginia, Wyoming, Oklahoma, and North Dakota. Most notably, Trump ended Elliott County's nearly 150-year tradition of voting Democratic in every presidential election, winning with 2,000 votes to Clinton's 740, or 70%–26%. Nevertheless, he became the first Republican since Warren G. Harding in 1920 to win the White House without carrying Fayette County.

Caucuses

Republican caucus

Delegates were awarded to candidates who got 5% or more of the vote proportionally.

In order to avoid a local law forbidding one candidate to run for two offices in the same primary, Rand Paul paid to have a presidential caucus, which took place on March 5. Paul dropped out prior to this.

Democratic primary

Four candidates appeared on the Democratic presidential primary ballot:
Hillary Clinton
Bernie Sanders
Rocky De La Fuente
Martin O'Malley (withdrawn)

General Election

Polling

Predictions 
The following are final 2016 predictions from various organizations for Kentucky as of Election Day.

Results by county

Counties that flipped from Democratic to Republican 
Elliot (largest city: Sandy Hook)
Franklin (largest city: Frankfort)

By congressional district
Trump won 5 of 6 congressional districts.

See also
Democratic Party presidential debates, 2016
Democratic Party presidential primaries, 2016
Republican Party presidential debates, 2016
Republican Party presidential primaries, 2016

Notes

References

External links
 RNC 2016 Republican Nominating Process 
 Green papers for 2016 primaries, caucuses, and conventions
 Decision Desk Headquarter Results for Kentucky

KY
2016
Presidential